Mikhail Aleksandrovich Potylchak (5 October 1972 – 6 October 2014) was a  Russian professional footballer.

Club career
He made his professional debut in the Soviet Second League in 1991 for FC Torpedo Volzhsky. He played 1 game in the UEFA Intertoto Cup 1996 for FC Rotor Volgograd.

Death
He committed suicide by hanging in 2014.

Honours
 Russian Premier League bronze: 1996.

References

1972 births
Footballers from Saint Petersburg
2014 deaths
Suicides by hanging in Russia
Soviet footballers
Russian footballers
Russian Premier League players
FC Energiya Volzhsky players
FC Rotor Volgograd players
FC Tyumen players
FC Lada-Tolyatti players
Association football forwards
2014 suicides